Abiel Foster (August 8, 1735 – February 6, 1806) was an American clergyman and politician from Canterbury, Province of New Hampshire. He represented New Hampshire in the Continental Congress and the U.S. Congress.

Biography
Foster was born in Andover, Massachusetts, in 1735, the son of Captain Asa Foster of Colonel Ebenezer Colonial Regiment and Elizabeth Abbot. A relative of Jedediah Foster, a judge, American Revolutionary and Harvard Law graduate (1744), the first member of the Foster family in America to receive a "liberal education". Abiel Foster was inspired to follow in the footsteps of Jedediah and entered Harvard College, receiving a bachelor's degree in 1756. After studying in theology, he was ordained as a pastor in Canterbury, January 26, 1761, he married Hanna Badger in that year. He served as pastor in Canterbury until 1779. At that time Abiel Foster retired to private life but would not be long before he returned to public service. During his 18 years as Minister of Canterbury he built trust with the people and he was appointed to the General Court. During his life Abiel Foster held "various offices of trust and honour with reputation to himself and usefulness to the community.

Abiel Foster served in Congress under first President of the United States George Washington and 2nd President John Adams, while working with the Founding Fathers of the United States, to help build a functioning federal government.

While a member of the Continental Congress, Abiel Foster left an impression on a young Daniel Webster, after a meeting one summer afternoon. Webster's father, Ebenezer Webster told his son that he could have had Abiel Foster's place in the Congress if he had more votes. Ebenezer extolled the virtues of an education to his son, explaining that it was an education that made the difference between him and Foster. He said that "It is education that has made Foster what he is and the lack of it has made your father what he is".

Abiel Foster's first wife Hanna died in 1768. His second wife, Mary Wise Rogers, was the granddaughter John Rogers (Harvard); they had eight children. Martha, who married Jeremiah Clough, Mary who married Henry Gerrish, Abiel Jr. who married Susanna Moore, Elizabeth who married Enoch Gerrish and Nancy who married John Greenough.

Career
In 1775, Foster was Deputy to the Provincial Congress at Exeter. From 1783 to 1785, Foster was a delegate for New Hampshire to the Continental Congress. Between 1784 and 1788, he was a Judge of the Court of Common Pleas in Rockingham County N.H. On March 3, 1789, he became a member of the First United States Congress, under the first Constitution of the United States of America, as a Representative from New Hampshire until March 3, 1791. He returned to the New Hampshire Senate in 1791, serving there until 1794 when he was elected again to the U.S. House of Representatives. He served there from March 3, 1795, to March 3, 1803.

On July 14, 1798, Foster voted in favor of the Alien and Sedition Acts.

Death
Foster died in Canterbury on February 6, 1806. He is interred at the Center Cemetery, Canterbury, New Hampshire.

Memorial

March 22, 1942, the California Shipbuilding Company launches its 16th Liberty type, 10,500-ton freighter, S.S. Abiel Foster. The day before, the S.S. Benjamin Franklin, launched November 16, 1941, completed its test run. The S.S. Abiel Foster took part as a troop supply ship during World War II and contributed to the Invasion of Normandy.

References

External links
 Journals of the Continental Congress 1784-1789
 

1735 births
1806 deaths
People from Andover, Massachusetts
American Congregationalist ministers
Harvard College alumni
Continental Congressmen from New Hampshire
18th-century American politicians
New Hampshire state senators
Federalist Party members of the United States House of Representatives from New Hampshire
19th-century American politicians
18th-century Congregationalist ministers
People of colonial Massachusetts
People from Canterbury, New Hampshire
18th-century American clergy